There was no defending champion as the last edition of the tournament was canceled due to the COVID-19 pandemic.

Mackenzie McDonald won the title after defeating Jurij Rodionov 6–1, 6–2 in the final.

Seeds

Draw

Finals

Top half

Bottom half

References

External links
Main draw
Qualifying draw

Nur-Sultan Challenger - 1